Andrew Shumack was an American freelance journalist and photographer from Pennsylvania who disappeared during the First Chechen War, a month after he left Saint Petersburg for Chechnya, and is presumed dead.

Biography
Shumack had worked for the weekly Bethlehem Star before traveling to Russia.

In a July 19 postcard he sent to his parents from Russia, Shumack wrote, "Money is tight, but things are well." A Spanish reporter called the U.S. Embassy in Moscow on August 9 to report that Shumack's knapsack was left at the press center in Grozny.

Shumack was last seen July 28, 1995, when he left Grozny and headed toward the surrounding mountainous area.

Eight days earlier, on July 20, The St. Petersburg Press, an English-language newspaper, had provided Shumack with a letter of introduction to help him obtain press credentials. In return, Shumack was to give the paper photographs and stories for three months. He had also planned to feed his photos to The Philadelphia Inquirer. It was the first time he had ventured into a war zone. Journalists in Grozny found his backpack, sleeping bag and documents (including a copy of his passport) abandoned in his hotel.

He is feared to be dead because no one from the newspaper has heard from him since, and U.S. Embassy officials have not been able to locate him despite repeated trips to the region.

See also
List of people who disappeared

References

External links
Newseum, The Freedom Forum Journalists Memorial, Andrew Shumack Jr.

1990s missing person cases
American male journalists
American reporters and correspondents
Missing people
Missing person cases in Russia